Acalolepta bennigseni is a species of beetle in the family Cerambycidae. It was described by Per Olof Christopher Aurivillius in 1908. It is known from the Caroline Islands.

References

Acalolepta
Beetles described in 1908